2010 Mito HollyHock season

Competitions

Player statistics

Other pages
 J. League official site

Mito HollyHock
Mito HollyHock seasons